Capuns is a traditional food from the canton of Graubünden in Switzerland, predominantly made in the eastern part. They are made from Spätzle dough with pieces of dried meat, such as Bündnerfleisch and/or Salsiz, and rolled in a chard leaf. They are boiled in a gravy of bouillon, milk and water and served covered with grated cheese.

See also
Maluns, another typical dish of Graubünden
Cabbage rolls

References

External links 

 Capuns recipe

Dumplings
Meat dishes
Swiss cuisine
Culture of Graubünden